Kenneth William Richardson (born April 12, 1951) is a Canadian former professional ice hockey player.

Early life and education 
Richardson was born in North Bay, Ontario. He is a graduate of Widdifield Secondary School. After retiring from the NHL in 1980, Richardson earned his Bachelor of Education from Nipissing University.

Career 
Richardson first signed with the Columbus Owls of the International Hockey League in 1973. Following his first season, the St. Louis Blues signed him as a free agent, where he played for the NHL until 1979. In 2005, Richardson was inducted into the North Bay Sports Hall of Fame.

References

External links

1951 births
Living people
Canadian ice hockey forwards
Sportspeople from North Bay, Ontario
Peterborough Petes (ice hockey) players
St. Louis Blues players
Ice hockey people from Ontario
Undrafted National Hockey League players

Nipissing University alumni
People from North Bay, Ontario